An Hysteric Return: P.D.Q. Bach at Carnegie Hall is live recording of a P. D. Q. Bach concert in Carnegie Hall and was released on Vanguard Records in 1966.

Performers
Professor Peter Schickele, bicycle, windbreaker, tromboon
The Royal P.D.Q. Bach Festival Orchestra, Jorge Mester, conductor
Lorna Haywood, soprano
Marlena Kleinman, alto
John Ferrante, tenor
William Woolf, bass
The Okay Chorale, John Nelson, director
Maurice Eisenstadt, bagpipes
Robert Lewis, balloons

Track listing 
Oratorio — The Seasonings, S. 1½ tsp.
Chorus: "Tarragon of virtue is full"
Recitative: "And there were in the same country"
Duet: "Bide thy thyme"
Fugue
Recitative: "Then asked he"
Chorale: "By the leeks of Babylon, There we sat down, yea, we wept"
Aria: "Open sesame seeds"
Recitative: "So saying"
Duet: "Summer is a cumin seed"
Chorus with soloists: "To curry favor, favor curry"
"Unbegun" Symphony (Schickele)
III. Minuet
IV. Andante — Allegro
Pervertimento for Bagpipes, Bicycle and Balloons, S. 66
Allegro moulto
Romanze II (Adagio Sireno)
Minaret and Trio
Romanze I (Chi Largo)
Presto Changio

Sources
An Hysteric Return: P.D.Q. Bach at Carnegie Hall

P. D. Q. Bach live albums
1966 live albums
Vanguard Records live albums
Albums recorded at Carnegie Hall
1960s comedy albums